Lazarus Racanelli, O.P. (died 1484) was a Roman Catholic prelate who served as Bishop of Urbino (1478–1484).

Biography
Lazarus Racanelli was ordained a priest in the Order of Preachers.
On 14 Aug 1478, he was appointed during the papacy of Pope Sixtus IV as Bishop of Urbino.
He served as Bishop of Urbino until his death in 1484.

References

External links and additional sources
 (for Chronology of Bishops) 
 (for Chronology of Bishops) 

15th-century Italian Roman Catholic bishops
Bishops appointed by Pope Sixtus IV
1484 deaths
Dominican bishops